Red 5 is an independent comic book publisher, known for producing a combination of creator-owned and internally developed titles, including their best known title, Atomic Robo. Red 5 was one of the first comics publishers to jump into digital distribution.

Titles
7 Percent
Abyss
Afterburn
Atomic Robo
Bad Dreams
Beautiful Creatures (comic)
Bodie Troll
Bonnie Lass
Box 13 (in partnership with Comixology)
Drone
Haunted
Midknight
Moon Girl
Neozoic
Riptide
Spook
We Kill Monsters
ZMD: Zombies of Mass Destruction

Former titles
Atomic Robo
Foster Broussard: Demons of the Gold Rush
Midknight
Bodie Troll

Awards
2007 Gem Award won (Best New Publisher)
2008 Shuster Award nomination (Best Canadian Publisher)
2008 Eisner Award nomination (Best Limited Series) for Atomic Robo
2008 Eisner Award nomination (Best Colorist) for Ronda Pattison on Atomic Robo
2009 Shuster Award nomination (Best Canadian Publisher)

Notes

References

External links
 
 

Comic book publishing companies of the United States